Thomas Enqvist was the defending champion but did not compete that year.

Fernando Meligeni won in the final 6–4, 6–2 against Mats Wilander.

Seeds
A champion seed is indicated in bold text while text in italics indicates the round in which that seed was eliminated.

  Mark Woodforde (first round)
  Todd Woodbridge (second round)
  Magnus Gustafsson (second round)
  Richey Reneberg (quarterfinals)
  Javier Frana (semifinals)
  Jason Stoltenberg (semifinals)
  Félix Mantilla (first round)
  Michael Joyce (first round)

Draw

References
 Singles draw

Singles